Jodocus Willich (also Wilke, Wild; 1501 or c. 1486–1552) was a German physician and writer.

Opus 
 1543 Problemata De Ebriorvm affectionibus & moribus. Iodoco Willichio authore. Francofordii cis Viadrum Ioannes Hanaw excudebat. (Digitalisat)
 1549 Studentes, comoedia de vita studiosorum, nunc primum in lucem edita autore M. Christophoro Stummelio, F. Eiusdem carmen de iudicio Paridis. Addita est Praefatio Jodoci Willichii et Epilogus a M. Christophoro Cornero. Francoforti ad Viadrum in officina Joannis Eichorn anno MDXLIX. (Digitalisat.)
 1550 Wie man denen helffen sol, welche mit der pestilentzische gifft begriffen seind. Durch Doctorem Jodocum Willichium von Resell. Gedruckt zu Franckfort an der Oder durch Johann Eichorn. M.D.L. (Digitalisat)

External links

References

1501 births
1552 deaths
People from East Prussia
16th-century German physicians
German-language writers
German medical writers
16th-century German writers
16th-century German male writers